Searsioides is a genus of tubeshoulders native to the western central Pacific Ocean.

Species
There are currently two recognized species in this genus:
 Searsioides calvala (Matsui & Rosenblatt, 1979)
 Searsioides multispinus (Sazonov, 1977)

References

Platytroctidae
Ray-finned fish genera